Femoral nerve stretch test, also known as Mackiewicz sign, is a test for spinal nerve root compression, which is associated with disc protrusion and femoral nerve injury.


Uses 
The femoral nerve stretch test can identify spinal nerve root compression, which is associated with disc protrusion and femoral nerve injury. It can reliably identify spinal nerve root compression for L2, L3, and L4. It is usually positive for L2-L3 and L3-L4 (high lumbar) disc protrusions, slightly positive or negative in L4–L5 disc protrusions, and negative in cases of lumbosacral disc protrusion.

Procedure 
To perform a femoral nerve stretch test, a patient lies prone, the knee is passively flexed to the thigh and the hip is passively extended (reverse Lasegues). The test is positive if the patient experiences anterior thigh pain.

References 

Neurology procedures